Justin Haber (born 9 June 1981) is a Maltese professional footballer who plays as a goalkeeper for Maltese side Hibernians and formerly played with the Malta national football team.

Playing career

Floriana
Born in Floriana, Malta, Haber started his football career at Floriana F.C. During his three-year spell at Floriana, he made 23 appearances and was later sent on loan to a Bulgarian top division team Dobrudzha Dobrich.

Birkirkara
Justin then joined Birkirkara in 2002, and stayed with the club until 2005. Haber was a vital member of the team, gaining him 74 caps.

US Quevilly
Towards the end of 2005, Haber joined French-side US Quevilly, where he gained 27 caps.

Marsaxlokk
In 2006, Haber moved back to Malta to join Marsaxlokk FC for the 2006–07 season. He managed to help the small seaside club to win its first ever Maltese Championship.

Haidari
In June 2007, it was announced that Haber had joined Greek side Hololulu FC on a two-year contract. The club is based in a suburban town close to Athens and participates in the Greek Second Division.

Sheffield United
In July 2008 Haber joined Sheffield United on a two-year deal. Haber had previously undergone a trial during United's 2006-2007 season in the Premier League, however, then manager Neil Warnock decided not to offer the Maltese keeper a contract In August 2009, after failing to break into the Blades first team, Haber was allowed to join their sister club Ferencváros on loan until the end of the year.

Ferencváros
In January of the following year Haber signed an 18-month contract with Ferencvárosi TC. He was a regular first team pick, and in the 2010–11 season he helped his team become third place, and a chance to play in the Europa League.

Kerkyra F.C.
Haber signed a two-year deal with Greek Super League club Kerkyra on 5 July 2011.

Birkirkara F.C.
In 2012, he returned to Malta to play for Birkirkara F.C.

Restaurant owner
On 20 February 2020, Haber's restaurant Haber 16 was featured on the Netflix series Restaurants on the Edge.

References

External links
 
 
 
 

1981 births
Living people
People from Floriana
Maltese footballers
Malta international footballers
Association football goalkeepers
Maltese expatriate footballers
Maltese expatriate sportspeople in Bulgaria
Maltese expatriate sportspeople in France
Maltese expatriate sportspeople in Belgium
Maltese expatriate sportspeople in Greece
Maltese expatriate sportspeople in England
Maltese expatriate sportspeople in Hungary
Expatriate footballers in Bulgaria
Expatriate footballers in France
Expatriate footballers in Belgium
Expatriate footballers in Greece
Expatriate footballers in England
Expatriate footballers in Hungary
Floriana F.C. players
PFC Dobrudzha Dobrich players
Birkirkara F.C. players
US Quevilly-Rouen Métropole players
R.E. Virton players
Marsaxlokk F.C. players
Chaidari F.C. players
Sheffield United F.C. players
Ferencvárosi TC footballers
A.O. Kerkyra players
First Professional Football League (Bulgaria) players
Super League Greece players
Maltese Premier League players